Two ships of the United States Navy have been named USS Siboney, after the town of Siboney, Cuba, the site of American landings in the Spanish–American War.
  was a civilian ship requisitioned in World War I as a troopship and returned to the Ward Line (New York and Cuba Mail Steamship Company) after the war.
  was an escort carrier in service from 1945 to 1956.

United States Navy ship names